Andriy Olehovych Oliynyk (born 16 January 1986) is a Ukrainian football goalkeeper currently playing for Ukrainian Second League club Kremin.

Club history
Andriy Oliynyk signed with FC Kremin Kremenchuk during 2004 summer transfer window.

Career statistics

References

External links
  Profile – Official Kremin site
  FC Kremin Kremenchuk Squad on the PFL website
  Profile on the FFU website
 

1986 births
Living people
People from Bila Tserkva
FC Kremin Kremenchuk players
Ukrainian footballers
Association football goalkeepers
Ukrainian Second League players
Sportspeople from Kyiv Oblast